Zosuquidar (development code LY-335979) is an experimental antineoplastic drug.  Zosquidir inhibits P-glycoproteins. Other drugs with this mechanism include tariquidar and laniquidar. P-glycoproteins are trans-membrane proteins that pump foreign substances out of cells in an ATP dependent fashion. Cancers overexpressing P-glycoproteins are able to pump out therapeutic molecules before they are able to reach their target, effectively making the cancer multi-drug resistant. Zosuquidar inhibits P-glycoproteins, inhibiting the efflux pump and restoring sensitivity to chemotherapeutic agents.

Zosuqidar was initially characterized by Syntex Corporation, which was acquired by Roche in 1990. Roche licensed the drug to Eli Lilly in 1997. It was granted orphan drug status by the FDA in 2006 for AML.  In 2010, it was announced that a phase III clinical trial for the treatment of acute myeloid leukemia (AML) and myelodysplastic syndrome did not meet its primary endpoint and Eli Lilly discontinued its development.

References 

Experimental cancer drugs
Organofluorides
Cyclopropanes
Quinolines
Piperazines
Abandoned drugs